Milán Kalász (born 30 April 1992 in Ajka) is a Hungarian football player. He is currently a free agent.

Club statistics

Updated to games played as of 22 September 2013.

References
Haladas FC
Illes Academia

1992 births
Living people
People from Ajka
Hungarian footballers
Association football midfielders
Szombathelyi Haladás footballers
Nemzeti Bajnokság I players
Sportspeople from Veszprém County